Tum: A Dangerous Obsession is an Indian Hindi thriller film released in February 2004. Directed by Aruna Raje, it stars Karan Nath, Manisha Koirala and Rajat Kapoor.

Plot
Kamini Gupta and Vinod Gupta with their two children are a happy family. Vinod, a CEO of a  multinational corporation is very busy and has no time for the family. He is unable to make it to his wedding anniversary, leaving Kamini all alone. A young photographer, Jatin Pandey (Karan Nath) gives her company. He takes her pictures, also introduces to AD film Director Ramesh Tekwani for some AD shoots. they dine and dance together. In the morning when she wakes up, she finds herself naked in Jatin's bed. Jatin now craves and burns for Kamini who is the forbidden fruit in his life, leading from passion to a dangerous obsession. Towards the end Jatin is found murdered. Inspector Yusuf Malik (Aman Verma) takes the bizarre case. A murder trail with obsession and passion.

Cast
Manisha Koirala as Kamini Gupta, Vinod's wife
Karan Nath as Jatin Pandey
Rajat Kapoor as Vinod Gupta, Kamini's husband
Natanya Singh as Isha Malhotra
Aman Verma as Yusuf Malik

Music

 Rehna To Hai (duet)- Kumar Sanu, Alka Yagnik
 Rehna To Hai (solo)- Roop Kumar Rathod
 Rehna To Hai (Film version)- Alka Yagnik, Roop Kumar Rathod
 Kyun Mera Dil- Adnan Sami
 Dil To Udne Laga- Shreya Ghoshal
 Sangdil Sanam- Udit Narayan, Anuradha Sriram, Kunal Ganjawala
 Mera Dil Laile- Shaan

References

External links
 

2004 films
Indian erotic thriller films
2000s Hindi-language films
Films shot in India
Films set in India
Films shot in Mauritius
Films scored by Himesh Reshammiya
Films directed by Aruna Raje
2000s erotic thriller films